This is a list of gliders/sailplanes of the world, (this reference lists most gliders with references, where available) 
Note: Any aircraft can glide for a short time, but gliders are designed to glide for longer.

V

Váhala-Pleško
(Hubert Váhala & Štefan Pleško / Dílny PO MLL Sodomka, Vysoké Mýto, Pardubice, Bohemia)
 Váhala-Pleško VP-1 Jánošík

Váhaly-Sands
(H. Váhaly & S. Sands)
 Váhaly-Sands Jánošík

Vakhmistrov-Tikhonravov
(V. Vakhmistrov & M. Tikhonravov)
 Vakhmistrov-Tikhonravov Dragon

Valentin 
(Valentin Flugzeugbau GmbH / Valentin GmbH Geräte und Maschinebau)
 Valentin Kiwi
 Valentin Taifun
 Valentin Mistral-C

Valette
(Aimé Valette)
 Valette 1922 glider

Valk
(Solomon Fedorovitch Valk / Nikitin)
 Valk IOS
 Valk IOS-2

Valmiera Aviation Festival
 Valmierietis glider

van Dusen
(William van Dusen)
 van Dusen amphibian glidersicVanags
(Latvia)
 Vanags (glider)

Varoga-Počkaj
(Aleš Varoga - Duša Počkaj)
 Varoga-Počkaj glider

Vasquez (glider constructor)
 Vásquez Pampero

Vaughn
(Horace Vaughn)
 Vaughan 1909 glider

 Vaysse 
(Pierre Vaysse)
 Vaysse TCV-01 Trucavaysse
 Vaysse TCV-02 Trucavaysse
 Vaysse TCV-03 Trucavaysse
 Vaysse GEP-10 Trucavaysse
 Vaysse Trapanelle

 VEF 
(Eizens Delle / Valsts Elektrotehniskā Fabrika - State Electrotechnical Factory)
 VEF-1

Vekchine
(G. D. Vekchine)
 Vekchine 1910 glider

Verrimst-Maneyrol
(Robert Verrimst & Alexis Maneyrol)
 Verrimst-Maneyrol 1922 glider

Vetterli
(Ernst Vetterli)
 Vetterli Sperber

 VFW-Fokker 
(VFW-Fokker GmbH)
 VFW-Fokker FK-3
 VFW-Fokker Sirius

VG (glider constructor)
 VG-151

Viana (glider constructor)
 Viana (glider)

Viesturs (glider constructor)
 Viesturs (glider)

Vila
(Eliseo Vila)
 Vila Mainene 1

Villacampa-Hospital-Pérez-Panzano
(Vicente de Antonio Villacampa & José María Hospital & Jaime Julve Pérez & Antonio Panzano / Escuela de Aeromodelisme, Alerre)
 Aeropijolo

Vine
(S.W. Vine, Krugersdorp, Traansval)
 Vine 1930 glider

Vinklar
(Karel VINKLAR & Josef ŠVÉBIŠ)
 Vinklar Polydor

Vlaicu
(Aurel Vlaicu)
 Vlaicu 1909 glider

 VMA 
 VMA-200 Milan – Victor Minié Aéronautique, Saint-Cyr (DFS Weihe)
 VMA AIR 102

Voepel
 Voepel Schulgleiter tailless primary

Vogt
 Vogt Lo-100
 Vogt Lo-105 Zwergreiher – Dwarf Heron
 Vogt Lo-150 Bergfalke – Mountain Falcon
 Vogt Lo-170

Voisin
(Appareils d'Aviation Les Frères Voisin - Gabriel Voisin & Charles Voisin)
 Voisin LV-104

Voříšek
(Jaroslav Voříšek)
 Voříšek Sup

VSM
(Ladislav Smerček / Vývojová Skupina Morava)
 VSM-40 Démant

VSR Musachevo
(Panov & Panchovsky)
 VSR Musachevo Jastreb

VTRZ Jastreb
 VTRZ Jastreb H-49 Split
 VTRZ Jastreb Roda

Vuillemenot
(Roger Vuillemenot)
 Vuillemenot AE-11
 Vuillemenot AE-12
 Vuillemenot AE-15
 Vuillemenot AE-15 Motoplaneur
 Vuillemenot Biplace

 VSB
(Vysokoškolského Sportu Brno)
 VSB-35 Žebravý – OŠTÁDAL, Václav & GoIdy, J.
 VSB-37 - OŠTÁDAL, Václav
 VSB-62 Mazlik aka Vega
 VSB-66 Orlice

VTC
(Vazduhoplovno Tehnicki Centar'', Vrsac)
 VTC Delfin 1
 VTC Delfin 2
 VTC Delfin 3
 VTC Trener
 VTC HS-62
 VTC HS-64
 VTC Vuk-T
 VTC Kosava-2
 VTC Cirrus
 VTC SSV-17
 VTC Cirus HS-62
 VTC Cirus HS-64
 VTC Sole-77

Vyskočil
(Jaroslav Vyskočil)
 Vyskočil VŠ-504 Hemelice

VZ (glider constructor)
(VZ - Novi Sad Roda)
 VZ Jastreb

Notes

Further reading

External links

Lists of glider aircraft